Liam Andrew Dawson (born 1 March 1990) is an English cricketer who plays for Hampshire and for the England cricket team. He is a right-handed batsman who bowls slow left-arm orthodox spin. He made his international debut for England in July 2016, and has since played all three formats of the game for England, the last in 2018. Dawson was part of the England squad that won the 2019 Cricket World Cup, however, he did not play in any matches during the tournament.

Early career
Dawson started playing cricket at the age of 3 and joined Goatacre when he was 7. He then moved on to play his youth cricket at Chippenham Cricket Club in Wiltshire, where he was spotted by Hampshire.

After appearing regularly for Hampshire Second XI and Wiltshire in 2006, Dawson was selected for England under-19s tour of Malaysia in 2006/07. During the tour, he took impressive figures of 6/9 against Malaysia. During England under-19s Test series with Pakistan in 2007, he was England's leading wicket-taker.

Domestic and T20 franchise career
Dawson appeared in three List A matches for Hampshire towards the end of the 2007 season. He failed to take a wicket but he scored a run-a-ball 32 on his debut. On 19 September 2007, he made his first-class debut against Yorkshire, although he did not bat or bowl.

Dawson scored his maiden century at Trent Bridge against Nottinghamshire in 2008. In January 2009, he was called into the England Lions squad to tour New Zealand. Dawson was a member of Hampshire's 2009 Friends Provident Trophy winning team. In 2010, he played just eight Championship matches, averaging 29 with the bat.
In 2011, he averaged 36 in the Championship. He averaged 35 in List A games as he began to build a reputation for himself as a solid batsman.

In 2012, Dawson's bowling began to become more prominent, as he picked up 26 wickets for Hampshire in the County Championship, averaging 32. However, his batting regressed as he averaged less than 30 in the season. He also became an important part of Hampshire's bowling line-up in the T20's, taking nine wickets.

In 2013, Dawson scored over 1,000 first-class runs for the first time in his career, although he was less effective with the ball, taking just eleven Championship wickets. However, his bowling in One Day cricket became more effective as he took 12 List A wickets, the most in his career. He continued his impressive performances with the ball in T20 cricket, taking a further 13 wickets.
In 2014, after falling out of favour at Hampshire, Dawson moved to Essex on loan. Dawson performed well during the loan, and when he returned to Hampshire, he reclaimed his spot in the side. In 2015, he took 29 wickets in the Championship, and 12 in List A cricket as his bowling continued to improve.

In October 2018, Dawson was named in the squad for the Comilla Victorians team, following the draft for the 2018–19 Bangladesh Premier League. In April 2022, he was bought by the London Spirit for the 2022 season of The Hundred.

International career
In 2016, Dawson earned his first call up to a senior international squad when he was selected for England's squad for the 2016 ICC World Twenty20, although he didn't play a game for the side.

On 5 July 2016, Dawson made his Twenty20 International (T20I) debut for England against Sri Lanka.

On 4 September 2016, Dawson made his One Day International (ODI) debut for England against Pakistan. He scored ten runs and took figures of 2-70.

In November 2016, Dawson was named in England's Test squad for the final two matches of the series against India. He made his Test debut on 16 December 2016 against India in the fifth Test of the series. He scored an unbeaten 66 in his maiden innings, as England made 477. Murali Vijay was his first Test wicket, after he trapped him lbw, as he finished with figures of 2–129.

Dawson played in the second T20I against India, and took figures of 0-20 after opening the bowling.

On 6 July 2017, Dawson was called up to the England squad for the South Africa Test series and was selected to play as the second spinner on the side. He took four wickets and scored a pair of two-ball ducks.

On 21 May 2019, England finalised their squad for the 2019 Cricket World Cup, with Dawson named in the 15 man squad. He was one of two players, along with Tom Curran, who were unused as England won the tournament.

On 27 July 2020, Dawson was named in England's squad for the ODI series against Ireland.

In September 2021, Dawson was named as one of three travelling reserves in England's squad for the 2021 ICC Men's T20 World Cup, though he played no part in the tournament. He was recalled to the full T20I squad for the England tour of West Indies in 2022.

References

External links

1990 births
Living people
English cricketers
England One Day International cricketers
England Twenty20 International cricketers
England Test cricketers
Wiltshire cricketers
Hampshire cricketers
Essex cricketers
Mountaineers cricketers
Sportspeople from Swindon
People from Wiltshire
North v South cricketers
Rangpur Riders cricketers
Chattogram Challengers cricketers
Peshawar Zalmi cricketers
Islamabad United cricketers
Comilla Victorians cricketers
Cricketers at the 2019 Cricket World Cup
Southern Brave cricketers
London Spirit cricketers
Prime Bank Cricket Club cricketers
Sheikh Jamal Dhanmondi Club cricketers
Lahore Qalandars cricketers